Simpatico is an album by Danish rock band D-A-D. The album was released on 6 November 1997 to mixed reviews.

Track listing
"Empty Heads" – 4:20
"Simpatico" – 3:12
"Home Alone 4" – 3:45
"Cloudy Hours" – 3:59
"Hate to Say I Told You So" – 3:19
"No One Answers" – 3:03
"Mad Days" – 4:11
"Don't Tell Me Anything" – 3:45
"You Do What I've Just Done" – 4:19
"Life Right Now" – 4:08
"Now or Forever" – 3:41
"A Hand Without Strength" – 4:12
"Favours" (Japan only bonus track)

To date the album has sold 118,000+ copies in Denmark.

Charts

References

External links
 This album on D-A-D's official homepage

1997 albums
Albums produced by Nick Foss
D.A.D. (band) albums